Melanoma-associated antigen D4 is a protein that in humans is encoded by the MAGED4B gene.

This gene is related to members of the MAGED gene family, in terms of the sequence similarity and the chromosome location. This gene is expressed only in brain and ovary among normal tissues, and two transcript variants of this gene are specifically expressed in glioma cells among cancer cells. This gene and the other MAGED genes are clustered on chromosome Xp11. Multiple alternatively spliced transcript variants have been found for this gene, however, the full length nature of some variants has not been defined.

References

Further reading